Protein TSSC1 is a protein that in humans is encoded by the TSSC1 gene.

Function 

This gene has been reported as one of several tumor-suppressing subtransferable fragments located in the imprinted gene domain of 11p15.5, an important tumor-suppressor gene region. Alterations in this region have been associated with the Beckwith-Wiedemann syndrome, Wilms tumor, rhabdomyosarcoma, adrenocortical carcinoma, and lung, ovarian, and breast cancer. Alignment of this gene to genomic sequence data suggests that this gene may reside on chromosome 2 rather than chromosome 11.

References

Further reading